Ankur may refer to:
 Ankur (film), a 1974 Indian Hindi-language film by Shyam Benegal
 Ankur (food), edible sprouts
 Ankur (name), an Indian given name
Ankuram, 1993 Indian film
Anguram 1982 Indian film